Yokohama is the capital city of Kanagawa Prefecture, Japan. 

Yokohama may also refer to:
 Yokohama, Aomori, a town located in Aomori Prefecture, Japan

 Yokohama (chicken), a breed of chicken that originated in Germany in the 19th century
 Yokohama (born 1991), a horse jockeyed by Madeleine A. Pickens
 Yokohama Kaidashi Kikō, a manga and anime series
 Yokohama Rubber Company, a Japanese tire manufacturer
 Linux Kernel 2.6.35 or Yokohama, a computer operating system software version; see List of Linux kernel names